Jan Sven Håkan Stenbäck (28 October 1951) is a Swedish former football player and manager. A midfielder, he made 199 Allsvenskan appearances for Djurgårdens IF and scored 46 goals. He also played for Sandvikens IF.

References

1951 births
Living people
Association football midfielders
Swedish footballers
Allsvenskan players
Djurgårdens IF Fotboll players
Åtvidabergs FF managers
Swedish football managers